The  superyacht Skade was launched at the Holland Jachtbouw yard in Zaandam. United States-based Tripp Design Naval Architects designed the exterior of Skade, with interior design by Rhoades Young Design.

Design 
The hull is built out of aluminium as well as the superstructure, with teak laid decks. The yacht is classed by Lloyd's Register and registered in the Cayman Islands. She has a sail area of 3,995m².

See also
 List of large sailing yachts
Comparison of large sloops
 Luxury yacht
 Holland Jachtbouw

References

2016 ships
Sailing yachts
Ships built in the Netherlands